Liquid Sound Company are an American acid/psychedelic rock band, formed in the late 1990s.

History
Formed by John Perez in 1996, the group originates from Arlington, Texas. Perez has mainly been busy playing heavy doom with bands Solitude Aeturnus and Sorrows Path, adding to the band's lack of stability over the years as a steady, active band. The group features psychedelic influences from west coast psychedelic to the heavier Hawkwind territory, noting Dead Flowers and Agitation Free as influencing artists.

Rockadelic Records released the debut album, Exploring The Psychedelic, in 1996 where Perez is supported by Teri Pritchard (bass) and drummer Jason Spradlin. The band offers diversified songs with a minimalistic sound but also features heavy fuzz guitars, oriental influences and hypnotic elements. They would release another effort in 2002 named Inside the Acid Temple, this time with Moog support by new bass player David Fargason. The album was re-released in 2005 by German Nasoni label on vinyl. The band returned in 2011 with the new album, Acid Music for Acid People on Nasoni, made of studio outtakes and two extended live cuts.

Liquid Sound Company was signed with Brainticket Records as of 2010.

Band members
The band members are, or have been:
John Perez, founder and lead guitarist
Jason Spradlin, drummer
Teri Pritchard, bassist
David Fargason, bassist
Alan Wise
Mark Cook
with the guest musicians:
Matt Miller
Sylvia Perez
along with various other collaborators, contacts listed are:
Chris Curylo
Robert Lowe,
Solitude Aeturnus

Discography
Exploring the Psychedelic (1996)
Inside the Acid Temple (2002)
Acid Music for Acid People (2011)
Psychoactive Songs For The Psoul (2021)

References
Notes

Bibliography

American psychedelic rock music groups